Broaghnabinnia is a summit of the Dunkerron Mountains, part of the Mountains of the Iveragh Peninsula in County Kerry, Ireland.

Geography 
The mountain lies northeast of Stumpa Dúloigh, the highest mountain of the Dunkerron range. With an elevation of 745 metres it is the 80th highest summit in Ireland.

Access to the summit 
Broaghnabinnia summit can be accessed scrambling, and is steep on all sides.

References

External links
 Broaghnabinnia at MountainViews

Mountains and hills of County Kerry
Mountains under 1000 metres
Marilyns of Ireland
Hewitts of Ireland